Eneko Capilla González (born 13 June 1995) is a Spanish professional footballer who plays for Super League Greece club Asteras Tripolis F.C. as a left winger.

Club career
Born in San Sebastián, Gipuzkoa, Capilla joined Real Sociedad's youth setup in 2010, aged 15, after starting out at Antiguoko. While still a junior, he made his senior debut with the reserves on 10 November 2012, coming on as a second-half substitute in a 2–2 home draw against SD Logroñés in the Segunda División B.

On 27 November 2013, Capilla was called up to train with the main squad. He was promoted to the B team on 23 June 2014, and renewed his contract on 1 October 2014 until 2020.

Capilla made his first-team – and La Liga – debut on 1 May 2015, replacing Carlos Vela in the dying minutes of a 3–0 home win against Levante UD. On 17 July of the following year, he was loaned to Segunda División side CD Numancia for one year.

On 15 August 2018, Capilla joined Cultural y Deportiva Leonesa on a season-long loan deal. On 12 July of the following year, upon returning from loan, he moved abroad after being transferred to Greek club Asteras Tripolis FC.

Personal life
Capilla's older brother, Asier, was also a footballer. A goalkeeper, he too was groomed at Real Sociedad.

References

External links
Real Sociedad official profile 

1995 births
Living people
Spanish footballers
Footballers from San Sebastián
Association football midfielders
La Liga players
Segunda División players
Segunda División B players
Antiguoko players
Real Sociedad B footballers
Real Sociedad footballers
CD Numancia players
Cultural Leonesa footballers
Super League Greece players
Asteras Tripolis F.C. players
Spanish expatriate footballers
Expatriate footballers in Greece
Spanish expatriate sportspeople in Greece